is a Japanese organizational theorist, management consultant, Former Professor and Dean of UCLA Luskin School of Public Affairs, and author, known for developing the 3C's Model.

Biography 
Born in 1943 in Kitakyūshū, Ohmae earned a BS in chemistry in 1966 from Waseda University, an MS in nuclear physics in 1968 from the Tokyo Institute of Technology, and a doctorate in nuclear engineering from the Massachusetts Institute of Technology in 1970.

After graduation, Ohmae subsequently worked as a senior design engineer for Hitachi from 1970 to 1972. From 1972 to 1995 he worked for McKinsey & Company.  As a senior partner he ran the company's Japan operations for a number of years.  He co-founded its strategic management practice, and served companies in a wide spectrum of industries, including industrial and consumer electronics, finance, telecommunications, food and chemicals.  In 1995 he ran for Governor of Tokyo, but lost to Yukio Aoshima.

In 1997 he went to the United States, where he was appointed Dean and Professor of UCLA Luskin School of Public Affairs.  In 1997 to 1998, he became a Guest professor of Stanford Graduate School of Business, MBA Program.

In 2011, he became a Project director for Team "H2O", and coordinated in preparing the report "What should we learn from the severe accident at the Fukushima Dai-ichi Nuclear Power Plant?" and submitted it to Goshi Hosono, the Minister of Environment & Minister for the Restoration of Nuclear Accident.  In 2012, he became a member of The "Nuclear Reform Monitoring Committee" of Tokyo Electric Power Company (TEPCO).

Work 
Ohmae introduced the Japanese management methods to a broad Western audience, a specifically the Toyota practice of just-in-time production.  He also outlined the differences between Japanese and Western companies, in particular:
 the long strategic planning horizon of Japanese companies 
 the short planning horizon based on shareholder value thinking of Western companies

Through his numerous publications, he coined many terms that are still in use today.  In the 1980s, he predicted and described globalization as prominent phenomenon in the world economy.

Publications 
Ohmae has written a number of books, including 
 The Mind of the Strategist
 The End of the Nation State 
 The Borderless World
 Triad Power

References

External links 

 
 KENICHI OHMAE Official Web Kenichi Ohmae Official Website
 Kenichi Ohmae Graduate School of business MBA via distance education

1943 births
Living people
Japanese businesspeople
Japanese business theorists
Japanese writers
Waseda University alumni
MIT School of Engineering alumni
McKinsey & Company people
Hitachi
People from Kitakyushu
Writers from Fukuoka Prefecture
Tokyo Institute of Technology alumni
UCLA Luskin School of Public Affairs faculty